The torrent tyrannulet (Serpophaga cinerea) is a small  bird of the tyrant flycatcher family. It breeds from Costa Rica south to northern Bolivia and northwestern Venezuela.

Description
The adult torrent tyrannulet is 10–11.4 cm long and weighs 8g. The male is pale grey above, and greyish white below, becoming white on the throat and lower belly. The head above the level of the eye is black with a concealed white crown patch, and the wings and tail are blackish. There are two thin grey-white wing bars.

The female is similar, but the top of the head is greyer and the crown patch is smaller or absent. Young birds have a browner cap, a brownish tint to the upperparts and broader, yellower wing bars.

Habitat

The torrent tyrannulet is a bird of rocky mountain streams at elevations from 300 to 2200 m, although it is less common at the lower altitudes where the water currents are weaker. There is a nesting record from Costa Rica as low as 35 m, possibly as a result of displacement of birds by hydroelectric work higher up the Sarapiquí River.

Behavior
Its substantial cup nest is built on a branch up to 4 m high over water, or on a rocky shore. It is lined with feathers and covered with moss on the outside, and the clutch is two unmarked pale buff or whitish eggs.

The torrent tyrannulet feeds on insects, caught in flight or picked off bankside vegetation or rocks. It has a direct dipper-like flight low over water, and frequently pumps its tail as it perches on a rock in the stream. Its call is a sharp penetrating chip, readily audible over the noise of the rushing water, and the song is a slower repetition of the call or a seek followed by a trilled ti,ti,ti,ti,ti,ti,.

References

Further reading

External links
 Torrent tyrannulet videos, photos & sounds on the Internet Bird Collection

torrent tyrannulet
Birds of the Talamancan montane forests
Birds of the Northern Andes
torrent tyrannulet